The 2014–15 UEFA Europa League knockout phase began on 19 February and concluded on 27 May 2015 with the final at Stadion Narodowy in Warsaw, Poland to decide the champions of the 2014–15 UEFA Europa League. A total of 32 teams competed in the knockout phase.

Times up to 28 March 2015 (round of 16) were CET (UTC+1), thereafter (quarter-finals and beyond) times were CEST (UTC+2).

Round and draw dates
All draws were held at UEFA headquarters in Nyon, Switzerland.

Matches may also be played on Tuesdays or Wednesdays instead of the regular Thursdays due to scheduling conflicts.

Format
The knockout phase involved 32 teams: the 24 teams which qualified as winners and runners-up of each of the twelve groups in the group stage, and the eight third-placed teams from the Champions League group stage.

Each tie in the knockout phase, apart from the final, was played over two legs, with each team playing one leg at home. The team that scored more goals on aggregate over the two legs advanced to the next round. If the aggregate score was level, the away goals rule was applied, i.e. the team that scored more goals away from home over the two legs advanced. If away goals were also equal, then thirty minutes of extra time was played. The away goals rule was again applied after extra time, i.e. if there were goals scored during extra time and the aggregate score was still level, the visiting team advanced by virtue of more away goals scored. If no goals were scored during extra time, the tie was decided by penalty shoot-out. In the final, which was played as a single match, if scores were level at the end of normal time, extra time was played, followed by penalty shoot-out if scores remained tied.

The mechanism of the draws for each round was as follows:
In the draw for the round of 32, the twelve group winners and the four third-placed teams from the Champions League group stage with the better group records were seeded, and the twelve group runners-up and the other four third-placed teams from the Champions League group stage were unseeded. The seeded teams were drawn against the unseeded teams, with the seeded teams hosting the second leg. Teams from the same group or the same association could not be drawn against each other.
In the draws for the round of 16 onwards, there were no seedings, and teams from the same group or the same association could be drawn against each other.

On 17 July 2014, the UEFA emergency panel ruled that Ukrainian and Russian clubs would not be drawn against each other "until further notice" due to the political unrest between the countries. Therefore, a Ukrainian club (Dnipro Dnipropetrovsk or Dynamo Kyiv) and a Russian club (Dynamo Moscow or Zenit Saint Petersburg) would not be drawn into the same tie in any round except the final.

Qualified teams

Europa League group stage winners and runners-up

Champions League group stage third-placed teams

Bracket

Round of 32
The draw was held on 15 December 2014. The first legs were played on 19 February, and the second legs were played on 26 February 2015.

Summary

|}

Matches

Everton won 7–2 on aggregate.

Torino won 5–4 on aggregate.

Sevilla won 4–2 on aggregate.

Wolfsburg won 2–0 on aggregate.

Ajax won 4–0 on aggregate.

Club Brugge won 6–1 on aggregate.

Dynamo Moscow won 3–1 on aggregate.

Dnipro Dnipropetrovsk won 4–2 on aggregate.

Napoli won 5–0 on aggregate.

Dynamo Kyiv won 4–3 on aggregate.

Villarreal won 5–2 on aggregate.

Roma won 3–2 on aggregate.

Zenit Saint Petersburg won 4–0 on aggregate.

1–1 on aggregate. Beşiktaş won 5–4 on penalties.

Fiorentina won 3–1 on aggregate.

Internazionale won 4–3 on aggregate.

Notes

Round of 16
The draw was held on 27 February 2015. The first legs were played on 12 March, and the second legs were played on 19 March 2015.

Summary

|}

Matches

Dynamo Kyiv won 6–4 on aggregate.

2–2 on aggregate. Dnipro Dnipropetrovsk won on away goals.

Zenit Saint Petersburg won 2–1 on aggregate.

Wolfsburg won 5–2 on aggregate.

Sevilla won 5–2 on aggregate.

Napoli won 3–1 on aggregate.

Club Brugge won 5–2 on aggregate.

Fiorentina won 4–1 on aggregate.

Notes

Quarter-finals
The draw was held on 20 March 2015. The first legs were played on 16 April, and the second legs were played on 23 April 2015.

Summary

|}

Notes

Matches

Sevilla won 4–3 on aggregate.

Dnipro Dnipropetrovsk won 1–0 on aggregate.

Fiorentina won 3–1 on aggregate.

Napoli won 6–3 on aggregate.

Notes

Semi-finals
The draw was held on 24 April 2015. The first legs were played on 7 May, and the second legs were played on 14 May 2015.

Summary

|}

Matches

Dnipro Dnipropetrovsk won 2–1 on aggregate.

Sevilla won 5–0 on aggregate.

Notes

Final

The final was played on 27 May 2015 at the Stadion Narodowy in Warsaw, Poland. The "home" team (for administrative purposes) was determined by an additional draw held after the semi-final draw.

References

External links
2014–15 UEFA Europa League

3
UEFA Europa League knockout phases